Amadou Mbow, is a Senegalese actor. He is best known for the role as 'Issa' in the supernatural romantic drama film Atlantics. Apart from being an actor, he is also a graphic designer and photography enthusiast.

Personal life
Mbow was born and grew up in Dakar, Senegal.

Son of a Senegalese jeweler of Fulani origin from Futa, Amadou Mbow is the eldest son of his mother and the brother of three sisters. During his teenage years, basketball occupied an important place in his life. After several years of practice at DUC (Dakar University Club) which allowed him to increase his awareness, his reactivity as well as his determination. He finally decides to quit sport to take a more interest in the audiovisual world by training himself as a self-taught person.

Career
In 2019, Mbow was selected for the film Atlantics directed by Mati Diop as her first feature film. In the film, he played a young policeman 'Issa' who is sent to investigate a mysterious fire that burns through Ada's nuptial bed on her wedding night.

The film had its premier in the capital of Dakar before its release in Senegal. The film had mainly positive reviews from critics and screened at several film festivals. The film later won the Grand Prix Award at the 2019 Cannes Film Festival.

In 2020, Amadou Mbow was selected for the Césars 2020 in the “Revelations” categories.

Filmography

References

External links
 

Living people
People from Dakar Region
Senegalese actors
1993 births